Gateway Television (GTV) is a Pan-African, American-owned subscription TV network based in London. The British-based company Gateway Television is owned by the American company, The Blackstone Group. 

GTV held the rights to 80% of league matches for the Premier League.  

They also held the rights for the CECAFA Cup. 

In January 2009, GTV announced it had gone into liquidation blaming the current financial and global crisis.

References

Television broadcasting companies of the United Kingdom
Mass media companies based in London
Defunct television channels in the United Kingdom
Sports television networks